Al Mabrak  is a town in the Amman Governorate of north-western Jordan.

References

Villages in Amman governorate